"No One" is a song originally recorded by Connie Francis in 1960. It was released as the B-side of her bigger hit, "Where the Boys Are," but charted separately. The song reached #34 on the U.S. Billboard Hot 100 during the winter of 1961.

Ray Charles cover
The most successful version of "No One" was recorded by Ray Charles in 1963. His version peaked at #21 on the U.S. Billboard Hot 100 and became a Top 10 R&B and AC hit.  It also charted in the United Kingdom, reaching #35.

Brenda Lee cover
In 1965, Brenda Lee covered "No One," with chorus and orchestra directed by Owen Bradley. It was released as an A-side, however, it was backed with "Too Many Rivers," which became the bigger hit (#13). Her rendition reached only #98 on the U.S. Billboard Hot 100. Nevertheless, it also reached #25 on the U.S. Easy Listening chart, and was the only version of the song to chart in Canada, where it became a Top 40 hit (#36).

Chart history
Connie Francis

Ray Charles

Brenda Lee

References

External links
 

 

1960 songs
1961 singles
1963 singles
1965 singles
Connie Francis songs
Ray Charles songs
Brenda Lee songs
MGM Records singles
ABC Records singles
Decca Records singles
Songs with lyrics by Doc Pomus
Songs with music by Mort Shuman